Aliso Canyon may refer to:

 Aliso Canyon, a canyon in Orange County, California, USA
 Aliso Canyon Oil Field, Los Angeles County, California, USA
 Aliso and Wood Canyons Wilderness Park, Orange County, California, USA
 Rancho Cañada de los Alisos, a former land grant in what is now Orange County, California, USA
 Aliso Canyon Bridge, an unbuilt bridge in Porter Ranch, Los Angeles

See also
 Aliso Canyon gas leak
 Aliso Creek (disambiguation)
 Aliso (disambiguation)